7 Seconds is a 2005 crime action thriller film directed by Simon Fellows. The film stars Wesley Snipes and Tamzin Outhwaite. The film was released on  Direct-to-DVD in the United States on June 28, 2005. The title refers to the timers at the beginning of the film, which are set at 00:07 (7 seconds).

Plot
After professional thief Jack Tulliver and his crew pull off a meticulously planned armored car heist, they are ambushed in Bucharest by a group of Romanian racketeers. This rogue group, tipped off to the heist by an unknown turncoat, kills Tulliver's associate Bull and most of his crew.

Tulliver escapes with a mysterious sealed case that was the most valuable part of the stolen loot. After car-jacking Sgt. Kelly Anders' car, he makes a getaway through Bucharest, but leaves Anders under the suspicion of her fellow officers. Meanwhile, Tulliver tries to save a team member who has been captured by Alexie Kutchinov, a sadistic Russian millionaire gangster in charge of the Romanian racketeers that ambushed Tulliver.

Jack and Sgt. Anders are saved by Bull's brother Mikail Mercea, a Romanian mobster who shoots Alexie and the turncoat Suza to avenge his brother's death.  During the aftermath, Tulliver and Anders learn that the sealed case contained an actual valuable painting that was originally believed to be a forgery.

Cast

Wesley Snipes as Jack Tuliver
Tamzin Outhwaite as Sergeant Kelly Anders
Dhobi Oparei as Spanky
Georgina Rylance as Suza
Pete Lee-Wilson as Alexei Kutchinov
Serge Soric as Mikhail Mercea
Andrei Ionescu as Frank "Bull" Mercea
Tomi Cristin as Captain Szabo
Adrian Lukis as Vanderbrink
Stephen Boxer as Underhill
Adrian Pintea as Grapini
Corey Johnson as Tool
George Anton as Banner
Tamer Hassan as Rahood

Production

Filming
7 Seconds is set and filmed in Romania (Bucharest and Castel Film Studios), over 32 days from June 28 to July 30, 2004.

Release

Home media
The DVD was released in Region 1 in the United States on June 28, 2005, and also Region 2 in the United Kingdom on 12 September 2005, it was distributed by Sony Pictures Home Entertainment.

Reception

Critical response
Despite action star Wesley Snipes heading the film, 7 Seconds was a failure in the DVD market and received bad reviews, described as "drivel" with "sloppy screenwriting".

References

External links
 

2005 films
2005 action thriller films
2005 crime thriller films
2005 direct-to-video films
2000s chase films
2000s crime action films
2000s heist films
American action thriller films
American chase films
American crime action films
American crime thriller films
American direct-to-video films
American heist films
British chase films
British action thriller films
British crime action films
British crime thriller films
British direct-to-video films
British heist films
2000s English-language films
English-language Romanian films
English-language Swiss films
Films about interracial romance
Films about kidnapping in the United States
Films about organized crime in the United States
Films produced by Donald Kushner
Films set in Bucharest
Films shot in Romania
Fratricide in fiction
Romanian action films
Romanian crime thriller films
Sony Pictures direct-to-video films
Swiss action films
Swiss crime thriller films
Films directed by Simon Fellows
2000s American films
2000s British films